Kim Mi-kyung (born October 14, 1963) is a South Korean actress. She is most active as a supporting actress in television dramas.

Kim has been a member of the Yeonwoo Mudae theater company since 1985.

Filmography

Television series

Web series

Film

Theater

Awards and nominations

References

External links

 Kim Mi-kyung at Popeye Entertainment
 
 
 

1963 births
Living people
South Korean television actresses
South Korean film actresses